The Gummel–Poon model is a model of the bipolar junction transistor. It was first described in an article published by Hermann Gummel and H. C. Poon at Bell Labs in 1970.

The Gummel–Poon model and modern variants of it are widely used in the popular circuit simulators such as SPICE.  A significant effect that the Gummel–Poon model accounts for is the variation of the transistor  and  values with the direct current level. When certain parameters are omitted, the Gummel–Poon model reduces to the simpler Ebers–Moll model.

Model parameters

Spice Gummel–Poon model parameters

See also
 Gummel plot

References

External links
 Bell System Technical Journal, v49: i5 May-June 1970 on archive.org
 Designers-Guide.org comparison paper Xiaochong Cao, J. McMacken, K. Stiles, P. Layman, Juin J. Liou, Adelmo Ortiz-Conde, and S. Moinian, "Comparison of the New VBIC and Conventional Gummel–Poon Bipolar Transistor Models," IEEE Trans-ED 47 #2, Feb. 2000. 

Transistor modeling

de:Ersatzschaltungen des Bipolartransistors#Gummel-Poon-Modell